Soy Festival is a yearly music festival happening in the autumn in Nantes, France. The festival focuses on avant-garde rock, experimental rock, noise rock, and other experimental music genres. The concerts take place in different locations in Nantes (Olympic, Lieu Unique, Pannonica, Barakason, Live, Bobard, Violon Dingue, Maison de quartier de Doulon, Rue'pture, le Blockhaus DY10, Planétarium, Ferrailleur)

Pre Soy (2001)
Billy Mahonie, Purr, My Own, Pull

Soy 1, 2003
Why?, Tepr, Matt Elliott, Many Fingers

Soy 2, 2004
Old Time Relijun, Julie Doiron, Zu, Flotation Toy Warning, Minor Majority, Victory Hall, Thomas Belhom, Park Attack, Encre, My Name is Nobody, Ichabod Crane, Bocage.

Soy 3, 2005
Dirty Three, Josh Pearson, Animal Collective, Elysian Fields, Berg Sans Nipple, Piano Magic, Fruitkey, Tazio and Boy, Trumans Water, Friction, Room 204, Dirge

Soy 4, 2006
Howe Gelb, Carla Bozulich, Hrsta, Grizzly Bear, Part Chimp, Jel, Charlottefield, Half Asleep, The Healthy Boy, Brian Straw, Soon, Lichens, Bird Show, Marissa Nadler, Kria Brekkan, Cyann and Ben

Soy 5, 2007
Zita Swoon, Stanley Brinks (aka Herman Düne,  (Ex Bastard), Rhys Chatham + guests (Guitar Trio project), Califone, SJ Esau (Anticon) and others

Soy 6, 2008
Why?, Son Lux, Volcano, Acid Mother Temple, No Age, Neptune, The Oscillation, Dwayne Sodahberk, Stearica, Pillars and Tongues, Chris Corsano & Mick Flower, Daniel Higgs, NLF3, Eric Chenaux, Six Organs of Admittance, Thank You, Skyphone, The Sight Below, CJ Boyd, Chris Garneau.

Soy 7, 2009
Animal Hospital, Fol Chen, Ichabod Crane, Banjo Or Freakout, Soap&Skin, Do Make Say Think, Part Chimp, Themselves, HEALTH, Clues, Thank You, Voice of the Seven Woods, Skeletons, Room 204, Benoit Pioulard, James Blackshaw, Matteah Baim, Pictureplane, Get Back Guinozzi, All in the Golden Afternoon, Mountains, The Happiness Project, Stars Like Flash, Our Brother the Native, Alexis Gideon, Action Beat and others.

References
 notification edition 2009 on Pitchfork Media
 review on fragil.org about 2008 edition
review of Rhys Chatham about his performance
 review on visitationsmusic about Chatham's performance in 2008
 French review about edition #6

Music festivals in France
Indie rock festivals
Tourist attractions in Nantes
Experimental music festivals